Agonum extensicolle is a species of ground beetle from Platyninae subfamily that can be found in Arizona, United States and Canada.

References

Beetles described in 1823
Beetles of North America
extensicolle